Miguel Ebreo (born 21 November 1939) is a Filipino sprinter. He competed in the men's 4 × 100 metres relay at the 1964 Summer Olympics.

References

1939 births
Living people
Athletes (track and field) at the 1964 Summer Olympics
Filipino male sprinters
Olympic track and field athletes of the Philippines
Place of birth missing (living people)